Pollia is a genus of sea snails, marine gastropod mollusks in the family Pisaniidae.

Species
According to the World Register of Marine Species (WoRMS) the following species with valid names are included within the genus Pollia :
 Pollia bednalli (G.B. Sowerby, 1895)
 Pollia crenulata (Röding, 1798)
 Pollia delicata (E.A.Smith, 1899)
 Pollia fumosa (Dillwyn, 1817)
 Pollia fuscopicta (G.B. Sowerby, 1905)
 Pollia imprimelata Fraussen & Rosado, 2011
 Pollia krauseri Tröndlé, 2013
 Pollia mirabelmaxcencei Cossignani, 2017
 Pollia mollis (Gould, 1860)
 Pollia mondolonii Fraussen, 2012
 Pollia pellita Vermeij & Bouchet, 1998
 Pollia rawsoni (Melvill, 1897)
 Pollia rubens (Küster, 1858)
 Pollia rubiginosa (Reeve, 1846)
 Pollia sowerbyana (Melvill & Standen, 1903)
 Pollia subcostata (Krauss, 1848)
 Pollia subrubiginosa (E.A.Smith, 1879) (synonym: Cantharus subrubiginosus Smith, 1879)
 Pollia undosa (Linnaeus, 1758)
 Pollia vermeuleni (Knudsen, 1980)
 Pollia wagneri (Anton, 1839)
 Pollia wrightae (Cernohorsky, 1974) (synonym: Cantharus wrightae Cernohorsky, 1974)
Species brought into synonymy
 Pollia armata Coen, 1933: synonym of Pollia dorbignyi (Payraudeau, 1826)
 Pollia assimilis (Reeve, 1846): synonym of Aplus assimilis (Reeve, 1846)
 Pollia auritula (Link, 1807): synonym of Gemophos auritulus (Link, 1807)
 Pollia bicolor (Cantraine, 1835): synonym of Enginella leucozona (Philippi, 1844)
 Pollia campisii Ardovini, 2015: synonym of Aplus campisii (Ardovini, 2015) (original combination)
 Pollia coccinea Monterosato, 1884: synonym of Pollia dorbignyi (Payraudeau, 1826)
 Pollia coccinea Monterosato, 1884: synonym of Muricopsis cristata (Brocchi, 1814)
 Pollia dorbignyi (Payraudeau, 1826): synonym of Aplus dorbignyi (Payraudeau, 1826)
 Pollia fragaria (W. Wood, 1828): synonym of Clivipollia fragaria (W. Wood, 1828)
 Pollia fusulus: synonym of Orania fusulus (Brocchi, 1814)
 Pollia haemastoma Gray, 1839: synonym of Gemophos sanguinolentus (Duclos, 1833)
 Pollia incarnata (Deshayes, 1830): synonym of Clivipollia incarnata (Deshayes, 1834)
 Pollia insculpta (G.B. Sowerby III, 1900): synonym of Cancellopollia insculpta (Sowerby III, 1900)
 Pollia karinae (Nowell-Usticke, 1959): synonym of Hesperisternia karinae (Nowell-Usticke, 1959)
 Pollia lapugyensis Hoernes & Auinger, 1884: synonym of Pollia dorbignyi (Payraudeau, 1826)
 Pollia marmorata (Reeve, 1846): synonym of Prodotia iostoma (Gray, 1834)
 Pollia melanostoma (Sowerby I, 1825): synonym of Cantharus melanostoma (Sowerby I, 1825)
 Pollia moravica Hoernes & Auinger, 1884: synonym of Pollia dorbignyi (Payraudeau, 1826)
 Pollia multicostata Hoernes & Auinger, 1884: synonym of Pollia dorbignyi (Payraudeau, 1826)
 Pollia philippi Hoernes & Auinger, 1884: synonym of Pollia dorbignyi (Payraudeau, 1826)
 Pollia scabra Locard, 1886: synonym of Aplus scaber (Locard, 1891) (original combination)
 Pollia scacchiana (Philippi, 1844): synonym of Aplus scacchianus (Philippi, 1844)
 Pollia shepstonensis Tomlin, 1926: synonym of Prodotia shepstonensis (Tomlin, 1926)
 Pollia tincta Conrad, 1846: synonym of Gemophos tinctus (Conrad, 1846)
 Pollia viverratoides (d'Orbigny, 1840): synonym of Gemophos viverratoides (d'Orbigny, 1840)

References

 Gofas, S.; Le Renard, J.; Bouchet, P. (2001). Mollusca, in: Costello, M.J. et al. (Ed.) (2001). European register of marine species: a check-list of the marine species in Europe and a bibliography of guides to their identification. Collection Patrimoines Naturels, 50: pp. 180–213

Pisaniidae